The Francês River is a river of Espírito Santo state in eastern Brazil.

See also
 List of rivers of Espírito Santo

References
 Brazilian Ministry of Transport

External link

Rivers of Espírito Santo